is a Japanese researcher who founded Japanese Academy of Facial Studies in 1995. He is a professor at the University of Tokyo. Harashima graduated from the University of Tokyo in 1968 and received a Ph.D. in 1973 from the same school.

References

External links 
Personal website

1945 births
Living people
University of Tokyo alumni